Waldemar José Rial Ferrari (3 February 1940 – 15 September 2019) was a Uruguayan basketball player who competed in the 1960 Summer Olympics and in the 1964 Summer Olympics. He was born in Paso de los Toros, Tacuarembó Department. He twice presided over Club Atlético Goes.

References

External links

1940 births
2019 deaths
People from Tacuarembó Department
Uruguayan men's basketball players
1963 FIBA World Championship players
Olympic basketball players of Uruguay
Basketball players at the 1960 Summer Olympics
Basketball players at the 1964 Summer Olympics